Bloemendhal is a suburb in Colombo, Sri Lanka. Bloemendhal is also part of an area numbered Colombo 13. The name Bloemendhal is of Dutch origin, meaning 'Valley of Flowers'.

References

Populated places in Western Province, Sri Lanka